Thierry Poirey (born 5 November 1956) is a French sailor. He competed in the Flying Dutchman event at the 1984 Summer Olympics.

References

External links
 

1956 births
Living people
French male sailors (sport)
Olympic sailors of France
Sailors at the 1984 Summer Olympics – Flying Dutchman
Place of birth missing (living people)
Mediterranean Games gold medalists for France